Rafeeuddin Ahmed (born 1932) is a Pakistani diplomat who served as the Under-Secretary-General of the United Nations for 21 years.

Career
Rafiuddin Ahmed started his career as a lecturer in Political Science at the Government College University (Faisalabad) in 1954. Then he served as an official at the Foreign Service of Pakistan.

His various roles within the United Nations started on 2 May 1970 and have included:

 Executive Secretary at the United Nations Economic and Social Commission for Asia and the Pacific (1992 - 1994)
 Under-Secretary General for Political Affairs, Trusteeship and Decolonization
 Under-Secretary General and Chef de Cabinet for the UN Secretary General, Kurt Waldheim
 Under-Secretary-General and Special Representative of the Secretary-General for Humanitarian Affairs in South-East Asia
 Secretary of the Economic and Social Council
 Under-Secretary-General and Senior Adviser to the Administrator of United Nations Development Programme

In addition to his Secretary and Under-Secretary posts, he has served as: 
 Special Envoy of the Secretary-General to Secure Release of the Crew of the Russian Plane Force Landed in Kandahar by the Taliban Regime in Afghanistan
 Special Representative of the Secretary-General for the Laos-Thailand Conflict
 Special Representative of the Secretary-General for East Timor
 Special Representative of the Secretary-General for Cambodia
 Special Envoy of the Secretary-General for Myanmar
 Convenor of the Secretary-General's Task Force on Falkland Islands (Malvina) in 1982 
 Principal Aide to the UN Secretary-General for the Iran hostage crisis
Special Adviser on Iraq appointed by UN Secretary-General, Kofi Annan in 2003

Personal life and education
Rafeeuddin Ahmed is an alumnus of The Fletcher School of Law and Diplomacy at Tufts University in Medford, Massachusetts, where he studied in International Economics and International Law. He has also earned an MA in Political Science from the University of Punjab in Lahore, Pakistan.

Rafeeuddin Ahmed is married to Nighat Ahmed and is father to Zia Ahmed, also a Fletcher alumnus, and Kamaluddin Ahmed, a prominent lecturer at Lahore University of Management Sciences, Pakistan.

References

External links
 UN.org
 Tufts University profile (Archived)

Living people
Pakistani officials of the United Nations
Under-Secretaries-General of the United Nations
The Fletcher School at Tufts University alumni
University of the Punjab alumni
Pakistani diplomats
Government College University Faisalabad alumni
Special Envoys of the Secretary-General of the United Nations
1932 births